Saint-Aubin-de-Médoc ("Saint Aubin of Médoc") is a commune in the Gironde department in the Nouvelle-Aquitaine region in Southwestern France. Part of Bordeaux Métropole, it is located northwest of Bordeaux. In 2019, it had a population of 7,495.

Demographics

See also
Communes of the Gironde department

References

Communes of Gironde
Gironde communes articles needing translation from French Wikipedia